Anastasia Ndereba is a Kenyan female athlete and marathon runner. She was born on September 27, 1974. She is the sister of the more renowned athlete and Olympic Medalist Katherine Ndereba. Her first recorded professional competition was on November 6, 1999, when she completed the 8 km Senior Women's Cross-country race organised by the KAAA, where she finished 4th in a time of 34 minutes and 32 seconds. She debuted as an IAAF athlete officiated by the IAAF in 2001, when she competed in the 3,000 women's B category in Rieti, Italy and emerged 7th with a time of 9 minutes, 12.95 seconds.

In 2003, Anastasia compete and lost against her sister in the 10,000 km KAAA race in Kenya. Her sister beat Anastasia by less than a tenth of a second after she clocked 34:35.0 to Anastasia's 34:35.6 in front of a huge crowd in Ruring'u Stadium, in Nyeri Kenya.

KAA competitions
Anastasia Ndereba competed in several KAAA tournaments earlier in her career. In 06 Nov 1999, she competed in the 8 kilometer cross-country race, in which she emerged 4th with a time of 34 minutes and 32 seconds. This race was organised in Nairobi, Kenya and put her on the forefront to be selected for other competitions. On 24 December the same year, she competed in a similar race titled 'KAAA Energiser Crosscountry' in Machakos, Kenya, improving her time by 7 minutes to 27 minutes and 32 seconds. However, she placed 5th in this race. On 25 Mar 2000, she won her first major competition at the 10 km KAAA Meeting tournament in Nyeri, in which she finished first with a time of 36:06.70, earning her a first opportunity to compete in an international platform in the United States.

USA competitions
Between 15 April 2000 and 27 August 2000, Anastasia competed in 12 athletic competitions in the USA winning one of them and emerging second runner's up in a further three. On 15 April 2000, she competed in a 5 km version of the Cherry Blossom race at Cherry Hill, in which she placed second with a time of 16 minutes and 23 seconds. On May 7, 2000, she competed in the Blue Shield Broad Street Run in Philadelphia, USA. This was a 10-mile road race and her first major win internationally after she finished in first position in a time of 57 minutes and ten seconds. Her last major race in the USA during this period was race in Avlon, NJ, in which she emerged 4th after a consecutive series of no win races throughout the month and since May. She soon travelled back to Kenya and resumed KAAA competitions.

In February, 2001, she competed in the Yokohama International Women's Ekiden in Yokohama, Japan. in a 5 km road race and emerged 5th with a time of 16 minutes and 31 seconds. Six months later, she was second in the Alpicella-Monte Beigua competition, which was a 10.6 km race that she finished in 57 minutes. On 9 September 2001, she was the third to finish the European Interclub Championships for Women race in Salò, Italy with a time of 51 minutes and 34 seconds.

IAAF and debut in Half marathon and Marathon competitions
Anastasia made her debut in Half Marathon when she competed in the   Torino Half Marathon, in Torino, Italy on September 23, 2001. She won this race with a time of 1:12:36.

In April 2002, Anastasia made her debut in the Turin Marathon in Turin, Italy. She won this race after placing a time of 2:29:27. Four months later, she won the Lille Métropole half marathon in Lille, France. She did this in 1:11:45. A month later, in 22 Sep 2002, she won the Turin Half marathon with a time of 1:12:09, improving her personal best on the track from the previous year.

On October 27, 2002, she debuted in the Venezia Marathon in Venice, France. She won this race with a time of 2:29:03. This record surpassed her marathon record of 2:29:27 set in Turin earlier that year. From there, her performance declined noticeably throughout the year and the next.

On May 3, 2003, Anastasia participated in the Indianapolis Life 500 Festival half marathon in Indianapolis USA. She emerged second in a time of 1:11:59, four minutes more than her time in the Lile half marathon the previous year. In 1 Jun 2003, she participated in Suzuki Rock 'N' Roll marathon in San Diego usa. She emerged fourth with a time of 2:30:53. Her subsequent races in USA were in Dacenport, Falmouth, Flint, Park Forest, Philadelphia and Chicago between July and October. She placed 9th, 14, 9th, 6th, 8th and 11th positions respectively in these races before returning to Kenya.

Anastasia returned to USA in May 2004 and on May 8, she participated in the Indianapolis Life 500 Festival half marathon. She took the sixth position in a time of 1:16:16. She improved this time in the Vancouver half marathon 7 weeks later in Vancouver Canada, where she clocked 1:15:41 to take the second position. Five weeks later, on August 15, she further improved this time by 10 seconds to take the second position in the America's Finest City half marathon in San Diego, CA with a time of 1:15:31. After registering a weak performance in the Rock 'n' Roll half marathon in Virginia Beach, VA where she emerged 8th overall, she went ahead to win the Beirut marathon in a time of 2:36 minutes and 46 seconds. Her final major race that year was back home in Kenya, in which she was number seven in the Nyeri half marathon in an undocumented time.

In 2005, Anastasia competed in 4 half marathons and 2 marathons around the world. She won one marathon, the Toronto Waterfront Marathon in Toronto, Canada, with a time of 2:36:30.8; and the Safaricom half marathon in Nyeri, Kenya, with a time of 1:18:26. She further emerged second in two of them, the America's Finest City half marathon, at 1:16:01; and The Stone Harbor Lions Runwon none of them.

In 2006, Anastasia had three major races, two of them marathons. These were the Osaka International Women's in Osaka, Japan and the Hokkaido marathon in Sapporo, Japan. She finished 8th and 9th in a time of 2:32:47 and 2:45:52 respectively for the first and second races. She then went on a hiatus for four years, returning again in 2010.

When she returned in 2010, Anastasia participated in the Standard Chartered Nairobi marathon in Nairobi, Kenya and the Standard Chartered Mumbai marathon in Mumbai, India in 2010 and 2011 respectively, she performed dismally in both races, taking the 12th and 13th positions with a time of more than 2 hours and 47 minutes in both. She improved her time in the 2012 Nagano Olympic Commemorative marathon of 2012 when she clocked 2:43:33 and became the 9th athlete to finish the race.

References

1974 births
Living people
People from Nyeri County
Kenyan female long-distance runners
Kenyan female marathon runners